The West Indies cricket team toured England in August and September 2017 to play three Test matches competing for the Wisden Trophy, one Twenty20 International (T20I) and five One Day Internationals (ODIs).

Ahead of the Test series, the West Indies played first-class warm-up matches against Derbyshire, Essex and Kent. They also played a two-day match against Leicestershire, as they did not get to the final of the 2017 NatWest t20 Blast.

In October 2016 the England and Wales Cricket Board (ECB) confirmed that the first Test at Edgbaston would be played as a day/night game. Tom Harrison, chief executive of the ECB, said that "we are excited by the prospect of staging our first ever day-night Test match". Following the Edgbaston Test match, both England's Alastair Cook and Neil Snowball, CEO of Warwickshire County Cricket Club, said that the "jury is out" with regards to holding another day/night Test in England. The ECB considered it a success, with the possibility of having a day/night Test as an annual fixture. England won the Test series 2–1, with James Anderson taking his 500th wicket in the third match.

The West Indies won the one-off T20I match at the Riverside Ground by 21 runs. In the opening ODI match, England won by 7 wickets, meaning that the West Indies would need to play in the 2018 Cricket World Cup Qualifier tournament, as they were not able to qualify directly for the 2019 Cricket World Cup. England's preparation for the fourth ODI was disrupted following the arrest of Ben Stokes in Bristol after the third ODI. Following the incident, both Stokes and Alex Hales were suspended by the ECB, meaning they would not be considered for selection for England until further notice. Despite this, England went on to win the ODI series 4–0.

Squads

Sam Billings was added to the England squad ahead of the fourth ODI, and Dawid Malan before the fifth, following the arrest of Ben Stokes and his and Alex Hales's subsequent suspension. Carlos Brathwaite was added to the West Indies' squad for the fifth ODI as a replacement for Jason Holder who went home to attend a funeral. Jason Mohammed was made captain for the match in Holder's absence.

Tour matches

First-class: Essex vs West Indies

First-class: Kent vs West Indies

First-class: Derbyshire vs West Indies

Two-day: Leicestershire vs West Indies

Test series

1st Test

2nd Test

3rd Test

T20I series

Only T20I

ODI series

1st ODI

2nd ODI

3rd ODI

4th ODI

5th ODI

Notes

References

External links
 Series home at ESPN Cricinfo

2017 in English cricket
2017 in West Indian cricket
International cricket competitions in 2017
West Indian cricket tours of England
August 2017 sports events in the United Kingdom